Qu. While the character 曲 is often pronounced Qǔ  (first tone) in Modern Mandarin, the surname is pronounced Qū in the first tone. It is written Khúc in Vietnamese.

Notable people
 Wanting Qu (Chinese: 曲婉婷, 1983-) simply known as Wanting, is a Chinese-born singer-songwriter and pianist who is based in Vancouver, British Columbia, Canada
 Khúc Thừa Dụ (Chinese: 曲承裕; pinyin: Qū Chéngyù) or Khúc Tiên Chủ (曲先主; Qū Xiānzhǔ) (?–907) was a Vietnamese Jiedushi of Vietnam and Jinghai-jun (Tĩnh Hải quân), in the early 10th century
 Qu Bo (Chinese: 曲波, 1981- ) a retired Chinese footballer
 Qu Yunxia (simplified Chinese: 曲云霞 1972 -) a Chinese Olympic athlete who specialized in the 1500 metres
 Qu Bo (writer) (Chinese: 曲波; pinyin: Qū Bō; 1923–2002) was a Chinese novelist
 Qu Tongfeng ( 1873–1929) a general who served Yuan Shikai and the Anhui clique
 Qu Xiaohui (Chinese: 曲晓辉; born 10 March 1987 in Dalian) is a Chinese football player who currently plays for Dalian Boyoung in the China League Two
 Qu Feifei (born May 18, 1982 in Shenyang, Liaoning) is a Chinese football (soccer) player who competed at the 2004 Summer Olympics.

See also
 Khúc clan
 Chinese Surnames
 Han Chinese
 Kinh people

Chinese-language surnames
Individual Chinese surnames